A força está em nós (English: The strength is in us) is the second studio album of the French-born Portuguese singer David Carreira. It was released on 11 November 2013 on the Portuguese Farol Música label and reached number 2 on the official Portuguese Albums Chart.

Track list

Charts

References

2013 albums
David Carreira albums